Koli is any of several languages closely related to Gujarati:

Kachi Koli language
Parkari Koli language 
Wadiyara Koli language (Tharadari Koli)